The Bethlehem Motors Corporation was a manufacturer of tractors, automobiles and trucks in Allentown, Pennsylvania, between 1917 and 1926.

Tractor manufacturing
In 1918 and 1919, the Corporation built the Model 18-36 tractor, which weighed three tons, and was powered by a Beaver 4-cylinder engine with two forward speeds. Standard equipment included a Stromberg carburettor, Bosch magneto and Fedders radiator. The tractor was not a success, probably due to the poor financial position of the company, the crowded tractor market in the United States, and the 1920 agricultural depression.

Automobile manufacturing
In 1920, the Bethlehem Motors Corporation built the 'Ideal' automobile, which was to be sold only outside the United States. The Ideal was a four-seater sedan with a 40 hp engine built by Bethlehem, Timken axles, and was priced at $3,000. The company went into receivership later that year, and all plans to further produce and sell the car were discontinued. New management disposed of the unsold cars for approximately $1,000 each in 1921.

Truck manufacturing

Truck manufacture began in 1917, with -ton trucks powered by Golden, Belknap and Swartz engines, and a -ton vehicle using a North American engine. The smaller models cost $1,245; the larger models $1,775. Speeds were between 12 and 18 mph, depending on the engine governor used. Production in 1919 was approximately 3,500. By 1920, all Bethlehem trucks came with electric starter and lights, with the company motto at this time being "Trucks bought today without electric lights will be out of date tomorrow". Despite these new features, business decreased, with the company going into receivership. The last Bethlehem trucks, and the last vehicles of any type manufactured by the Bethlehem Motors Corporation were assembled in 1926. The factory was bought by Hahn and Company in 1927. Bethlehem was also one of the manufacturers of Liberty Trucks for the United States Army during World War I.

References

External links
1919 Bethlehem Motor Truck Corporation advertisement. Vintageproductads.com

Companies based in Allentown, Pennsylvania
Vehicle manufacturing companies established in 1917
Defunct motor vehicle manufacturers of the United States
1917 establishments in Pennsylvania
Vehicle manufacturing companies disestablished in 1926
1926 disestablishments in Pennsylvania
Motor vehicle manufacturers based in Pennsylvania